Laelia fasciata is a moth of the family Erebidae first described by Frederic Moore in 1883. It is found in Sri Lanka, India and Myanmar. One subspecies is recognized, Laelia fasciata rubripennis Moore, 1884.

References

Moths of Asia
Moths described in 1883